Scorpio Rising is the third album by British electronica band Death in Vegas. It was released on 16 September 2002 in the United Kingdom via Concrete Records, and on 17 June 2003 in the United States via Sanctuary Records. The album takes its name from an experimental film by Kenneth Anger. Scorpio Rising features guest vocalists Liam Gallagher, Hope Sandoval, Nicola Kuperus, and Paul Weller, as well as string arrangements by L. Subramaniam. The album was recorded at Death in Vegas' own studio The Contino Rooms in early 2002, with the strings recorded at Trinity Wave Station in Chennai, India.

The song "Hands Around My Throat" contains samples from the songs "Rock Around the Clock" by Telex (written by Max C. Freedman and Jimmy DeKnight) and "Whitewater" by Tortoise (written by Dan Bitney, Bundy Kien Brown, John Herndon, Doug McCombs, and John McEntire). "23 Lies" includes a sample from "Goin' Back" by The Byrds, written and composed by Carole King and Gerry Goffin. "Scorpio Rising" takes its main riff from "Pictures of Matchstick Men" by Status Quo, and is co-credited to songwriter Francis Rossi.

Several songs on the album have appeared in television advertisements and on film soundtracks:

 "Girls" is featured on the soundtrack to the 2003 film Lost in Translation and 2004 film D.E.B.S..
 "Hands Around My Throat" is featured on the Animatrix soundtrack; in a commercial TV-spot by Sony Ericsson for Sony Ericsson K700i; and in the episode "Once Bitten" of Big Little Lies.
 "Scorpio Rising" is used in a commercial by the Belgian mobile phone operator Base and at the end of the episode "Touch and Go" of ER.
 "Help Yourself" was used in a commercial by the former Czech mobile phone operator Eurotel (now Telefónica O2 Czech Republic); in Johan Kramer's 2003 film The Other Final; in the 2003 Girl Skateboards video Yeah Right!; and in the 2005 film 12 and Holding.

Reception

The album has a score of 68 out of 100 from Metacritic based on "generally favorable reviews". E! Online gave the album an A and stated: "There's no reason to buy any other electronica CD this year." Filter gave it a score of 84% and said that the sounds "are equally rich and emotive, just not as goblin-esque [as The Contino Sessions]." Alternative Press gave it four stars out of five and said that the album has "Mind-melting Indian-flavored strings... wispy vocal guest turns... and snarling, droning guitar riffs drench rising in a pleasing psychedelic haze." Mojo also gave it four stars and called it "exotic, deep, unique". URB gave it three-and-a-half stars out of five and called it "A curious but highly enjoyable mix of experimental beats and good old-fashioned guitar rock."

Other reviews are pretty average, mixed or negative: Q gave the album three stars out of five and stated: "There's no doubting their enthusiasm but it seems Death In Vegas have compiled a list of great cult albums rather than actually making one themselves." Blender gave it two stars out of five and called it "A strangely dispassionate exercise in record-collection rock." Playlouder gave it one-and-a-half stars out of five and stated that in the album "there are a couple of standout tracks, and the rest falls on its arse."

Track listing

Singles
 "Leather"/"Girls" and "XXX" (double 12" vinyl only, 22 July 2002)
 "Hands Around My Throat" (9 September 2002)
 "Scorpio Rising" (16 December 2002)
 "So You Say You Lost Your Baby" (canceled as a commercial single; was set for release on 7 April 2003)

Personnel

Death in Vegas
 Richard Fearless - production, keyboards, Hammond organ, ukulele (Help Yourself)
 Terry Miles - engineering
 Ian Button – guitar
 Seamus Beaghen – engineering, second guitar
 Mat Flint – bass
 Simon Hanson – drums

Vocalists
 Nicola Kuperus – vocals on "Hands Around My Throat"
 Susan Dillane – vocals on "23 Lies" and "Girls"
 Liam Gallagher – vocals on "Scorpio Rising"
 Hope Sandoval – vocals on "Killing Smile" and "Help Yourself"
 Paul Weller – vocals on "So You Say You Lost Your Baby"
 Dot Allison – vocals on "Diving Horses"

Additional musicians
 Andrew Hackett, Danny Hammond – guitar
 Gary "Mani" Mounfield – bass on "So You Say You Lost Your Baby"
 Pete Stanley – banjo on "Killing Smile"
 James Walbourne – mandolin on "Killing Smile"
 Sara Wilson – cello
 Ganesh – sitar
 Produced and mixed by Death in Vegas.
 S. Sai Kumar – sound engineer for string arrangements
 A.J. Daniel – assistant sound engineer for string arrangements
 Design by FearlessBeaven. Band photo by Grant Fleming.

Charts

Certifications

References

External links
 Death in Vegas interview with The Guardian, 30 August 2002
 

Death in Vegas albums
2002 albums